Perkerson Park is a  park in the Capitol View/Sylvan Hills neighborhoods of Atlanta, Georgia with everything from a splash pad to an elaborate playground to recreational fields, all under the shady canopy of huge oak trees. Park is open 6:00 AM to 11:00 PM daily.

History
Thomas Jefferson Perkerson (1804 –1878), son of Dempsey Perkerson (1778-1875), was from South Carolina and settled in DeKalb County (now Fulton County).  Thomas Jefferson Perkerson married Isabella Ferguson and settled on two Land Lots, numbers 103 and 104.  The Perkerson family owned 405 acres of land that was mostly used as a family farm.  These Land Lots were bounded by Lakewood Avenue on the south, Stewart Avenue (now Metropolitan Parkway) on the east, Sylvan Road on the west, and Deckner Avenue on the north.  In the late 1830s, the Perkerson Family built their home on this land, which land is now in the Sylvan Hills section (outside of the Capitol View Historic District). The family home formerly stood at 552 Perkerson Road, which was continuously occupied by the family until 1934.

Thomas Jefferson Perkerson became the first sheriff of Fulton County, upon its creation in 1853 from DeKalb County.  His son, Angus M. Perkerson (1843-1895), served in the Confederate Army and then also later served as the sheriff of Fulton County from 1873 to 1883.  His son, also named Angus M. Perkerson, became the editor of the Atlanta Journal Magazine.

Thomas Jefferson and Isabella Perkerson had seven children.  One of their daughters, Matilda "Till," married Jeremiah Silas Gilbert (1839-1932), a son of the first practicing physician ever to live in what is now Fulton County, and lived in the Gilbert House which is now a City of Atlanta Landmark Site, at 2238 Perkerson Road.  Another daughter, Elizabeth "Lizzie," married Sumner E. Butler from New York and returned to live in the Perkerson home in her later years.   It has been noted that at the time of the Civil War, the Perkersons owned 405 acres, had 3 dogs, 4 children ages 6 to 18, and owned 8 slaves valued at $16,000, and household and kitchen items valued at $500.

On December 2, 1864 Elizabeth (Lizzie) wrote a letter to her brother Angus while he was in the Confederate Army, at that time located in Virginia.  The letter relates how the Perkerson family stayed in their house during the war and interacted with both Union and Confederate soldiers in order to save their family and home.  The letter tells of the sentiments of the family towards the soldiers, helping the wounded in the area, and the scene in Atlanta after General Sherman’s troops passed: “Atlanta is a perfect mass of ruins. I haven’t been there as yet, but from what they tell me it is awful.  All the public buildings are gone except the City Hall. Whitehall Street swept completely.”

The Perkerson property was in the Fourteenth or "Black Hall District," also known in legal parlance as the 530th Georgia Militia District. It became known as such upon the creation of DeKalb County in December 1822 (District 14: Land Lots 103 and 104 with 101 ¼ acres on each Land Lot). The district became much smaller after the Civil War due to the continued growth of Atlanta.

In 1944, 315 acres of the Perkerson estate were sold for subdivision purposes, some ten years after the death of Lizzie Perkerson Butler, who was the last family member to live in the old house. (This old family home had survived even General Sherman’s burning of Atlanta, because the family refused to leave the house, due to the fact that Matilda Perkerson Gilbert was at that time too sick to be moved.)   The part of the estate sold off in 1944 included the 50 acres that now make up Perkerson Park, which park was donated by the Perkerson Family to the City of Atlanta.  Perkerson Park is located at 770 Deckner Avenue SW. The park was created circa 1952 by the City of Atlanta and is a contributing property to the city. It is the largest green space and only public park in the Capitol View Historic District. It covers approximately 50 acres in the southwest portion of the district and serves as a community public space. The recreation building therein is used for multiple purposes, such as continuing education, neighborhood meetings, and also as the local polling facility. The park has a sculpture which was created circa 1985 by Toby Martin, and is entitled "My Spirit is Changing." (This history of Perkerson Park was taken directly from the Historical Designation Study completed by a Georgia State University team in 2011)

Amenities

Perkerson Park is both an active and a passive park. Amenities include:
Playground area
Splash pad
Recreation center
Tennis courts
Basketball courts
Baseball, Football, and recreational ball-fields
Permanent Disc Golf course
Covered Picnic Pavilion with Outdoor Grills

However, it also has open fields, a sizeable creek, and large wooded areas. This area of the park is a good area to relax and escape from the activity of the rest of the park.

Splashpad

In May 2012, the splash pad opened in Perkerson Park. Thanks to joint efforts from Councilmember Joyce Sheperd, the Department of Parks, Recreation, and Cultural Affairs, and the Atlanta BeltLine, neighborhood children now have a fun place to cool off on hot summer days. The splashpad is open daily, 10 a.m. until 8 p.m., from May 1 through October 1.

Disc Golf Course

Perkerson Park is the site of the only permanent public disc golf course in the city of Atlanta. Perkerson is a championship caliber course and one of metro Atlanta's most scenic, most challenging, and longest length courses with several par 4's and a par 5.

Plays through a mature hardwood forest and along a rock-lined stream with hilly terrain. Dual teepads on all but one hole. Every teepad has its own sign. The short pads (red) cater to rec and intermediate skill level and the long pads (black) cater to advanced skill level. 
 
Holes: 18
Target Type: Gateway Titan
Tee Type: Rubber
Landscape: Moderately Hilly & Moderately Wooded
Foliage: Average
Course Length: 5,284 ft - 6,867 ft
Course Designer: John Ritger
Hole Length: Under 300 ft: 5 | 300 – 400 ft: 10 | Over 400 ft: 3

Future Expansion

The Perkerson Park Master Plan identifies three vacant parcels well suited for park expansion. The parcels are just south of the existing park boundary, and would extend the park to Casplan Street near the intersection of Metropolitan Parkway. The total park expansion area is roughly 10.5 acres. In addition, future park renovations and improvements are in the works to Restore the Park Stream, Add Street Parking, Ball Field and Tennis Court Improvements, Playground Expansion, Add New Pedestrian Gateways, Add Pedestrian Pathways, Constructing an Event Lawn with dedicated stage, etc.

Gallery

References

Parks in Atlanta